Penicillium subrubescens is a species of the genus of Penicillium which produces high amounts of inulinase.

References

Further reading 
 

subrubescens
Fungi described in 2013